Druivenkoers Overijse is a single-day road bicycle race held annually in August in Overijse, Belgium. Since 2005, the race is organized as a 1.1 event on the UCI Europe Tour.

Winners

External links
 Official Website

UCI Europe Tour races
Recurring sporting events established in 1961
1961 establishments in Belgium
Cycle races in Belgium
Overijse